SS Loongana was a Bass Strait passenger ship initially owned by Union Steamship Company of New Zealand. In 1922 she was transferred to Tasmanian Steamers Pty Ltd.  
SS Loongana was in service between 1904-1934 and was the first ship registered in the Southern Hemisphere with steam turbine propulsion.

Loongana is an Aboriginal word meaning to be swift or to fly.

Sources

External links
 
 

Bass Strait ferries
History of transport in Tasmania
Ships of the Union Steam Ship Company